The 2008 French Super Series is the tenth tournament of the 2008 BWF Super Series in badminton. It was held in Paris, France from October 28 to November 2, 2008.

Final results

External links
French Super Series 2008 at tournamentsoftware.com

French Open (badminton)
French Super Series, 2008
French
International sports competitions hosted by Paris